Crawford County is a county located in the U.S. state of Iowa. As of the 2020 census, the population was 16,525. Its county seat is Denison. The county was named for William Harris Crawford, U.S. senator from Georgia and United States Secretary of the Treasury.

History
In January 1851, the Iowa Legislature authorized the creation of 50 additional counties in the state. Due to its lack of inhabitants, the designated Crawford County area was attached to Shelby County for purposes of revenue, taxation, and judicial matters.

In 1855 there were sufficient settlers, who petitioned for separation from Shelby. This was granted, and a county governing structure was established. The county as then designated did not include its present western townships.

In 1865, four eastern townships of Monona County were separated from that county and incorporated into Crawford County's boundary.

After several adjustments and reorganizations, the present arrangement of Crawford County townships was completed in June 1872.

Geography

Major highways
 U.S. Highway 30 – runs ENE across bottom of county. Enters at Dunlap, exits to Carroll County at Westside.
 U.S. Highway 59 – runs generally north–south through center of county, passing Schleswig and Denison. Its exit into Shelby County is five miles east of its entry from Ida County.
 Iowa Highway 37 – cuts the SW corner of county, running SE from Monona County to Harrison County.
 Iowa Highway 39 – runs north and ENE from Denison to Kiron, then into Ida and Sac Counties.
 Iowa Highway 141 – enters SE part of county at Aspinwall, runs west to intersection with US Highway 59, two miles above the county's south line.

Adjacent counties
Ida County − north
Sac County − northeast
Carroll County − east
Audubon County − southeast
Shelby County − south
Harrison County − southwest
Monona County − west
Woodbury County − northwest

Demographics

2020 census
There were 6,855 housing units of which 6,255 were occupied.

2010 census
There were 6,943 housing units, of which 6,413 were occupied.

2000 census

As of the census of 2000, there were 16,942 people, 6,441 households, and 4,489 families residing in the county. The population density was 24 people per square mile (9/km2). There were 6,958 housing units at an average density of 10 per square mile (4/km2). The racial makeup of the county was 93.10% White, 0.76% Black or African American, 0.28% Native American, 0.49% Asian, 0.01% Pacific Islander, 4.59% from other races, and 0.77% from two or more races. 8.75% of the population were Hispanic or Latino of any race.

There were 6,441 households, out of which 31.60% had children under the age of 18 living with them, 58.50% were married couples living together, 7.00% had a female householder with no husband present, and 30.30% were non-families. 26.20% of all households were made up of individuals, and 13.10% had someone living alone who was 65 years of age or older. The average household size was 2.53 and the average family size was 3.03.

In the county, the population was spread out, with 26.50% under the age of 18, 8.10% from 18 to 24, 25.70% from 25 to 44, 22.50% from 45 to 64, and 17.10% who were 65 years of age or older. The median age was 38 years. For every 100 females there were 100.90 males. For every 100 females age 18 and over, there were 98.80 males.

The median income for a household in the county was $33,922, and the median income for a family was $40,231. Males had a median income of $28,696 versus $19,798 for females. The per capita income for the county was $15,851. About 6.90% of families and 11.10% of the population were below the poverty line, including 12.70% of those under age 18 and 5.60% of those age 65 or over.

Communities

Cities

Arion
Aspinwall
Buck Grove
Charter Oak
Deloit
Denison
Dow City
Kiron
Manilla
Ricketts
Schleswig
Vail
Westside

Former cities

Astor
Berne
Boyer
Kenwood

Townships

 Boyer
 Charter Oak
 Denison
 East Boyer
 Goodrich
 Hanover
 Hayes
 Iowa
 Jackson
 Milford
 Morgan
 Nishnabotny
 Otter Creek
 Paradise
 Soldier
 Stockholm
 Union
 Washington
 West Side
 Willow

Population ranking
The population ranking of the following table is based on the 2020 census of Crawford County.

† county seat

Politics
Like most of Western Iowa, Crawford County leans toward the Republican Party. However, although it gave two-thirds of its vote to Donald Trump in 2016, it supported Democrat Barack Obama in 2008.

Education
School districts include:
 Ar-We-Va Community School District
 Boyer Valley Community School District
 Charter Oak-Ute Community School District
 Denison Community School District
 East Sac County Community School District
 IKM-Manning Community School District
 Maple Valley-Anthon Oto Community School District
 Odebolt Arthur Battle Creek Ida Grove Community School District
 Schleswig Community School District

Former school districts:
 Battle Creek-Ida Grove Community School District
 IKM Community School District
 Manning Community School District
 Maple Valley Community School District
 Odebolt-Arthur Community School District
 Wall Lake View Auburn Community School District

See also

National Register of Historic Places listings in Crawford County, Iowa
Crawford County Courthouse

References

External links
Crawford County departments
Crawford County Assessors
Crawford County Ancestry File

 
1837 establishments in Wisconsin Territory
Populated places established in 1837